The House at 57 Woburn Street in Reading, Massachusetts is a Queen Anne style house designed by architect Horace G. Wadlin and built c. 1889 for Alfred Danforth, railroad employee who served for a time as Reading's town clerk.  It is one of the town's more elaborate Queen Anne houses, with patterned shingles and an ornately decorated porch.  The front-facing gable is particularly elaborate, with wave-form shingling and a pair of sash windows set in a curved recess.

The  house was added to the National Register of Historic Places in 1984.

See also
Woburn Street Historic District
National Register of Historic Places listings in Reading, Massachusetts
National Register of Historic Places listings in Middlesex County, Massachusetts

References

Houses on the National Register of Historic Places in Reading, Massachusetts
Houses in Reading, Massachusetts
1887 establishments in Massachusetts
Queen Anne architecture in Massachusetts